Regino Delgado (7 September 1956 – 2 February 2016) was a Cuban footballer. He competed at the 1976 Summer Olympics and the 1980 Summer Olympics. Delgado was a member of the silver medal winning squad at the 1979 Pan American Games.

References

External links
 

1956 births
2016 deaths
People from Santo Domingo, Cuba
Cuban footballers
Cuba international footballers
Association football midfielders
FC Villa Clara players
Olympic footballers of Cuba
Footballers at the 1976 Summer Olympics
Footballers at the 1980 Summer Olympics
Pan American Games medalists in football
Pan American Games silver medalists for Cuba
Footballers at the 1979 Pan American Games
Medalists at the 1979 Pan American Games